Antonije Isaković (Serbian Cyrillic: Антоније Исаковић; 6 November 1923 – 13 January 2002) was a Serbian writer and member of the Serbian Academy of Science and Arts. He won the NIN Prize in 1982 for his novel Tren 2.

He was one of the authors of the Memorandum of the Serbian Academy of Sciences and Arts. Isaković was one of the fifty members of the Serbian Academy of Science and Arts who signed the petition against Slobodan Milošević in October 1999.

Bibliography 
Antonije Isaković wrote numerous novels and stories and some of his selected works are: 
 Velika deca, 1953
 Paprat i vatra, 1962
 Pripovetke, 1964
 Prazni bregovi, 1969
 Compilation of works in five volumes, 1976
 Tren 1, roman, 1976
 Tren 2, roman, 1982
 Berlin kaputt, 1982
 Obraz, 1988
 Govori i razgovori, 1990
 U znaku aprila: i druge priče, 1991
 Miran zločin, 1992
 Drugi deo mog veka: da se ne zaboravi, 1993
 Gospodar i sluge, 1995
 Riba, 1998
 Nestajanje, 2000

References 

1923 births
2002 deaths
Writers from Belgrade
Serbian novelists
Serbian politicians
Members of the Serbian Academy of Sciences and Arts
20th-century Serbian novelists
Yugoslav Partisans members